Srednebazanovo (Urta Baźan) is a rural locality (a village) in Starobazanovsky Selsoviet, Birsky District, Bashkortostan, Russia. The population was 90 as of 2010. There are 2 streets.

Geography 
Srednebazanovo is located 24 km southwest of Birsk (the district's administrative centre) by road. Akudi and Starobazanovo are the nearest rural localities.

References 

Rural localities in Birsky District